María Teresa Lara Aguirre del Pino (Tlatlauquitepec, 1904 – May 23, 1984) was a Mexican lyricist and composer.

Family 
Lara was a daughter of Joaquín M. Lara and his wife, María Aguirre del Pino. Her aunt was Refugio Aguirre del Pino.

Her elder brother was Agustín Lara, who was a songwriter and composer, singer and actor.

Her sister-in-law was María Félix, mother of actor Enrique Álvarez Félix, who appeared in many telenovelas.

She worked with Agustín on several songs and married Nicanor Guzmán Guerrero (1909 – 1992). Some of Agustín's songs were copyrighted in her name.

Works, editions and recordings
 Me dejaste
 Valencia 
 Toledo – recorded on recital ¡Ay, ay, ay!

References

1904 births
1984 deaths
María Félix
Musicians from Mexico City
Mexican women composers
Mexican composers
Maria Teresa
20th-century composers
20th-century women composers